Bavaria-Straubing denotes the widely scattered territorial inheritance in the Wittelsbach house of Bavaria that were governed by independent dukes of Bavaria-Straubing between 1353 and 1432; a map (illustration) of these marches and outliers of the Holy Roman Empire, vividly demonstrates the fractionalisation of lands where primogeniture did not obtain. In 1349, after Emperor Louis IV's death, his sons divided Bavaria once again: Lower Bavaria passed to Stephan II (died 1375), William (died 1389) and Albert (died 1404). In 1353, Lower Bavaria was further partitioned into Bavaria-Landshut and Bavaria-Straubing: William and Albert received a part of the Lower Bavarian inheritance, with a capital in Straubing and rights to Hainaut and Holland. Thus the dukes of Bavaria-Straubing were also counts of Hainaut, counts of Holland, and of Zeeland.

In 1425, with the death of Duke John III, the Straubing dukes became extinct in the male line. His possessions were partitioned between the Dukes of Bavaria-Munich, Bavaria-Landshut and Bavaria-Ingolstadt in 1429 under arbitration of the emperor. His niece Jacqueline became Countess of Hainaut in her own right.

Dukes of Bavaria-Straubing 
 Jointly held by William I and Albert I 1347-1388
 Albert I "of Holland" 1388-1404
 Albert II 1389-1397 jointly held with Albert I
 William II 1404-1417
 John III 1418-1425 disputed with
 Jacqueline, Countess of Hainaut 1417-1432

After the succession struggle between Jacqueline and her uncle John, Bavaria-Straubing was divided between Bavaria-Ingolstadt, Bavaria-Landshut, and Bavaria-Munich.

Footnotes
 

Former states and territories of Bavaria
County of Holland
Duchy of Bavaria